Hulta is a settlement in Örebro County, Sweden.

References

Populated places in Örebro County